Moscow Does Not Believe in Tears is a 1980 Soviet romantic drama film made by Mosfilm. It was written by Valentin Chernykh and directed by Vladimir Menshov. The leading roles were played by Vera Alentova and Aleksey Batalov. The film won the Academy Award for Best Foreign Language Film in 1981.

Plot

Part One

In 1958, three young women, Katerina, Lyudmila, and Antonina, live in Moscow in a workers' dormitory, having emigrated from rural villages. Antonina (Raisa Ryazanova) is seeing Nikolai, a reserved but kind young man whose parents have a dacha in the country, while Katerina (Vera Alentova) is serious and hardworking, working in a factory while dreaming of earning a degree in chemistry. When she is asked to house-sit for her well-to-do Moscow relatives, Lyudmila (Irina Muravyova), flirty and impetuous, invites herself along and convinces Katerina to throw a dinner party as a ploy to meet successful men. At the party, Lyudmila talks with Sergei, a famous hockey player, while Katerina meets Rudolf (Yuri Vasilyev), a smooth talker who works as a cameraman for a local television station. During Antonina and Nikolai's wedding, Lyudmila and Antonina learn that Katerina is pregnant. Rudolf refuses to marry Katerina, who gives birth to a daughter, Aleksandra. Lyudmilla and Sergei marry.

Part Two

Twenty years later, in 1978, Katerina has become the executive director of a large factory, living with her now 20-year-old daughter in a nice apartment. She, Lyudmila and Antonina are still close; Lyudmilla has divorced Sergei, who has quit playing hockey and become an alcoholic, while Antonina is happily married to Nikolai and lives in the countryside with their three children.

One evening, as Katerina is returning home, she meets Gosha (Aleksey Batalov), who begins a conversation with her after she notices his dirty shoes. Gosha is an intelligent tool-and-die maker in a research institute (where his instrument maintenance skills are an enormously valued help to his scientist coworkers), and Katerina finds him insightful enough to begin dating him. Gosha states his belief that a woman should not make more money than her husband, so Katerina only reveals she works in a factory, but not as its director. As their romance progresses, Rudolf unexpectedly reenters Katerina's life, and tells her he wants to meet his daughter. Katerina curtly tells him that she does not want to see him again, but he shows up uninvited at her apartment and tells Gosha and Aleksandra about the interview, revealing Katerina's executive position (and high salary) to Gosha. Gosha's pride is hurt, and he leaves the apartment; unable to stop him, Katerina reveals to Aleksandra that Rudolf is her father.

Gosha disappears from Katerina's life, and she becomes frantic. A week later, Lyudmila, Antonina, and Nikolai come to her apartment to comfort her. Nikolai gathers what little information Katerina knows about Gosha (which does not even include his last name) and finds him drinking alone, still stung by Katerina's "betrayal". Nikolai convinces Gosha to return home, and, alone with Katerina and Aleksandra, Gosha asks for dinner. As he eats, Katerina watches him, saying "I've been looking for you for such a long time." "Eight days", Gosha replies, to which Katerina, with tears in her eyes, repeats, "I've been looking for you for such a long time."

Cast
 Vera Alentova – Katerina Aleksandrovna Tikhomirova ("Katya")
 Irina Muravyova – Lyudmila Sviridova ("Lyuda")
 Raisa Ryazanova – Antonina Buyanova ("Tosya")
 Aleksey Batalov – Georgy Ivanovich ("Gosha"), Katya's partner
 Aleksandr Fatyushin – Sergei Gurin ("Seryozha"), a hockey player, Lyuda's ex-husband
 Boris Smorchkov – Nikolai, Tosya's husband
 Viktor Uralsky – Mikhail Ivanovich, Nikolai's father
 Valentina Ushakova – Anna Nikitichna, Nikolai's mother
 Yuri Vasilyev – Rodion Rachkov ("Rudolph"), Aleksandra's father
 Yevgeniya Khanayeva – Rodion's mother
 Liya Akhedzhakova – Olga Pavlovna, single's club director
 Zoya Fyodorova – "Aunt" Pasha, dormitory secretary
 Natalya Vavilova – Aleksandra, Katya's daughter
 Oleg Tabakov – Vladimir, Katya's lover
 Vladimir Basov – Anton Kruglov, deputy chief of the central board
 Alexander Borodyansky – Gosha's friend
 Garri Bardin – chemical plant chief engineer
 Cameo appearances:
 Andrei Voznesensky
 Innokenty Smoktunovsky
 Georgi Yumatov
 Leonid Kharitonov
 Tatyana Konyukhova
 Pavel Rudakov
 Veniamin Nechayev

Reception

Response
Over 93 million Soviet viewers saw the film in the cinema, making it one of the most successful films in Soviet history. In 2021, a poll conducted by Russian Public Opinion Research Center voted it as the best Soviet film of all time among Russian viewers. The film currently holds a rating of 8.1/10 on IMDb.

Then-U.S. president Ronald Reagan watched the film several times before his meetings with Mikhail Gorbachev, the general secretary of the Communist Party of the Soviet Union, in order to gain a better understanding of the "Russian soul".

Awards and nominations

Background 
 Moskva slezam ne verit, translated officially as "Moscow Does Not Believe in Tears", but more accurately, "Moscow puts no faith in tears" or "Moscow is unmoved by tears", is a Russian proverb meaning "don't complain, solve your problems by yourself".
 Valentin Chernykh admitted that he received many proposals from Hollywood at that time, but he rejected all of them, since he thought that any remakes of the movie would fail.
 Vitaly Solomin, Vyacheslav Tikhonov, Oleg Yefremov, and Leonid Dyachkov auditioned for the part of Gosha. However, none of them convinced the director to take them, and he even wanted to play the main character himself, until he saw Aleksey Batalov in the film My Dear Man on television.
 It was also difficult to find someone apt for the part of Katerina. Many well known actresses such as Anastasiya Vertinskaya, Zhanna Bolotova, Irina Kupchenko, Natalya Sayko, Valentina Telichkina and Margarita Terekhova auditioned for the part, but most of them did not like the script, so the part eventually went to the director’s wife, Vera Alentova.

Songs from the film
 Jamaica by Robertino
 Les Routiers by Yves Montand
 Besame Mucho
 Satirical couplets ("The Diplomatic Couplets") from c.1954 by Pavel Rudakov and Veniamin Nechaev
 Daddy Cool by Boney M
 Давай закурим (Let's take a smoke) by Klavdiya Shulzhenko
 Александра (Aleksandra) by Sergey Nikitin and Tatyana Nikitina
 Диалог у новогодней ёлки (Dialogue by the New Year tree) by Sergey Nikitin and Tatyana Nikitina

See also
 List of submissions to the 53rd Academy Awards for Best Foreign Language Film
 List of Soviet submissions for the Academy Award for Best International Feature Film

References

External links
 

 Watch Moscow Does Not Believe in Tears online at official Mosfilm site with English subtitles
 Moscow Does Not Believe in Tears at RussianFilmHub.com
 An interview with Vladimir Menshov (Russian)
 Trailer and Screenshots

1980 films
1980 in the Soviet Union
1980 romantic drama films
Soviet romantic drama films
Best Foreign Language Film Academy Award winners
Mosfilm films
1980s Russian-language films
Films directed by Vladimir Menshov
Films set in 1958
Films set in 1978
Films set in Moscow
Films set in the Soviet Union
Films shot in Moscow
Films shot in Moscow Oblast
Russian romantic drama films
Films about mother–daughter relationships